The Dudidontu River is a tributary of the Nahlin River in northwest part of the province of British Columbia, Canada. It joins the Nahlin River, which forms the Inklin River, one of the main tributaries of the Taku River. Almost half of the Dudidontu's flow comes from its main tributary, Kakuchuya Creek, and Kakuchuya Creek's main tributary, Matsatu Creek.

The Dudidontu River is in the traditional territory of the Taku River Tlingit First Nation, part of the Tlingit people.

Geography
The Dudidontu River originates near the headwaters of the Little Tahltan River and Egnell Creek, in the Level Mountain Range on the Nahlin Plateau. It flows by Camp Island Lake and between Level Mountain and the Heart Peaks. It is joined by its main tributary, Kakuchuya Creek, and Kakuchuya Creek's main tributary Matsatu Creek, both of which flow from Level Mountain.

This section of the river is a series of almost continuous heavy rapids.

The Dudidontu River's watershed's land cover is classified as 37.9% shrubland, 25.3% conifer forest, 22.6% barren, and small amounts of other cover.

See also
List of British Columbia rivers

References

External links
 

 

Cassiar Land District
Level Mountain
Rivers of British Columbia
Tlingit
Nahlin Plateau